Cameron Murray may refer to:

Cameron Murray (footballer) (born 1995), footballer
Cameron Murray (rugby union) (born 1975), Scottish rugby union player
Cameron Murray (Emmerdale), fictional Emmerdale character
Cameron Murray (rugby league) (born 1998), rugby league footballer